Titouan Droguet (born 15 June 2001) is a French tennis player.

Droguet has a career high ATP singles ranking of 247 achieved on 20 February 2023. He also has a career high doubles ranking of 238 achieved on 26 September 2022.

Droguet has won 1 ATP Challenger doubles title at the 2022 Open du Pays d'Aix with Kyrian Jacquet.

Challenger and Itf Futures/World Tennis Tour Finals

Singles: 6 (3–3)

Doubles: 11 (4-7)

References

External links
 
 

2001 births
Living people
French male tennis players
Sportspeople from Villeneuve-Saint-Georges
21st-century French people